Odero Gon (15 April 1933 – 2 June 2021) was an Italian footballer who played as a defender or midfielder for A.C. Palmanova, Udinese Calcio, and A.S.D. Vittorio Falmec San Martino Colle.

Gon died on 2 June 2021, aged 88.

References

1933 births
2021 deaths
People from Palmanova
Italian footballers
Association football defenders
Association football midfielders
Udinese Calcio players
Footballers from Friuli Venezia Giulia